Pierre Bernard (27 June 1932 – 28 May 2014) was a French footballer who played as a goalkeeper. He made 21 appearances for the France national team.

References

External links
 
 
 

1932 births
2014 deaths
Association football goalkeepers
French footballers
France international footballers
FC Girondins de Bordeaux players
CS Sedan Ardennes players
Nîmes Olympique players
AS Saint-Étienne players
Red Star F.C. players